Hong Kong Third Division League is the fourth-highest division overall in the Hong Kong football league system under the organization of Hong Kong Football Association.

Starting with the 2012–13 season, the two divisions of Hong Kong Third Division League were merged into one. Teams of Third Division League in the 2012–13 team were the 2 final round losing team and the 3rd to 10th placed teams of Hong Kong Third A Division League, along with the 3rd and 4th placed teams of Hong Kong Third District Division League. The remaining teams from Hong Kong Third A Division League and Hong Kong Third District Division League competed in Hong Kong Fourth Division League for the 2012–13 and 2013–14 seasons before the reformation was completed.

Prior to the 2012–13 season, the Third Division was divided into two parallel leagues: Hong Kong Third 'A' Division League and Hong Kong Third 'District' Division League. The first one was competed by club teams while the later one was played by teams sent by each District Council of Hong Kong. The top two teams in each league entered into the Third Division League Final Round to compete for the two promotion places to Hong Kong Second Division.

Format & rules
 Every team plays every other team in the league, home and away. The top two teams in the table at the end of the season earn the right to be promoted to the Second Division. Meanwhile, the bottom four teams in the table will be eliminated from the league system.
 No foreign players are allowed to be registered by any of the teams.
 Each team shall field at least two U22 players on the pitch at any given time.

See also
Hong Kong Third 'A' Division League
Hong Kong Third 'District' Division League
Hong Kong Fourth Division League
The Hong Kong Football Association

References
 League Rules, The Hong Kong Football Association website

 
4
Fourth level football leagues in Asia